Lim You-Hwan (born December 2, 1983 in South Korea) is a South Korean football player who currently plays for Busan IPark. He was a participant at 2003 FIFA World Youth Championship in United Arab Emirates and 2004 Summer Olympics in Greece.

Club statistics

International career statistics

References

External links
 
 Lim You-hwan – National Team stats at KFA 
 
 
 

1983 births
Living people
Association football defenders
South Korean footballers
South Korean expatriate footballers
South Korea international footballers
Footballers at the 2004 Summer Olympics
Olympic footballers of South Korea
Kyoto Sanga FC players
Jeonbuk Hyundai Motors players
Ulsan Hyundai FC players
Shanghai Shenxin F.C. players
Albirex Niigata players
Tokyo Verdy players
Busan IPark players
K League 1 players
K League 2 players
J1 League players
J2 League players
Chinese Super League players
Expatriate footballers in Japan
South Korean expatriate sportspeople in Japan
Expatriate footballers in China
South Korean expatriate sportspeople in China
People from Yeosu
Sportspeople from South Jeolla Province